Joonas Pöntinen (born 19 March 1990) is a Finnish football player currently playing for KuPS.

References
Guardian Football
Veikkausliiga

1990 births
Living people
Kuopion Palloseura players
Veikkausliiga players
Finnish footballers
Association football goalkeepers
People from Kuopio
Sportspeople from North Savo